Brophebarbital is a barbiturate derivative. It has sedative and hypnotic effects and is considered to have a moderate abuse potential.

References 

Barbiturates
Bromoarenes
GABAA receptor positive allosteric modulators